The Irish National Bowls Championships combines Northern Ireland and the Republic of Ireland. Traditionally the game was played mainly in Northern Ireland but the Kenilworth Bowling Club of Dublin joined the Irish Bowls Association in 1906 which prompted the merger into one team. With the exception of the Commonwealth Games players continue to represent a combined Ireland team.

The singles championship is called the Dr Rusk Cup named after Dr John Rusk, President of the IBA and the singles representative player at the Lawn Bowls at the 1934 British Empire Games. The Pairs is called the T.W McMullan Cup, the Triples is known as the Charlie Clawson Cup and the Fours is known as the C.L MacKean Cup. Roy Fulton is a record seven times singles champion closely followed by Martin McHugh with six wins.

The Women's National Championships were inaugurated in 1947 but only consisted of the pairs and fours initially. 

The national champions are determined by the winners of the Irish Bowling Association Championships. To qualify for the Championships bowlers must win their respective championship. The four qualifying tournaments are held by the Northern Ireland Private Greens League (NIPGL/NIWPGL), the Northern Ireland Bowling Association (NIBA/NIWBA), the Bowling League of Ireland (BLI/LBLI) and the Northern Ireland Provincial Bowling Association (NIPBA/PTWBA).

The 2020 and women's 2021 Championships were cancelled due to the COVID-19 pandemic.

Men's Singles Champions

+ Shared title due to final not being played.

Most titles

Men's Pairs Champions

Men's Triples Champions

Men's Fours Champions

Women's Singles Champions

Women's Pairs Champions

Women's Triples Champions

Women's Fours Champions

References

Bowls competitions
Irish road bowling
Bowls